Senasinghe may refer to

Sujeewa Senasinghe ,Sri Lankan politician
Thilak Senasinghe ,Sri Lankan journalist

Sinhalese surnames